Beisu is a town of Wuji County, Hebei province, China, located  west of the county seat and about double that northeast of downtown Shijiazhuang. , it has 18 villages under its administration.

See also
List of township-level divisions of Hebei

References

Township-level divisions of Hebei
Wuji County